The 1977–78 Seattle SuperSonics season was the 11th season of the franchise in the National Basketball Association (NBA). With a disappointing 5–17 start, the Sonics replaced coach Bob Hopkins with future Hall of Famer Lenny Wilkens, who led the team to a 47–35 finish. In the playoffs, the SuperSonics defeated the Los Angeles Lakers in three games in the First Round, then upset the defending NBA champions Portland Trail Blazers in six games in the Western Conference Semifinals, before finally defeating the Denver Nuggets in six games in the Conference Finals, making their first trip to the NBA Finals in franchise history, where they lost the series to the Washington Bullets in 7 games.

Draft picks

Roster

Regular season

Standings

Record vs. opponents

Game log

|-bgcolor=#fcc
| 1
| October 19
| @ Golden State
| L 84–116
| Fred Brown 21
|
|
| Oakland–Alameda County Coliseum Arena8,871
| 0–1
|-bgcolor=#fcc
| 2
| October 21
| Portland
| L 99–106
| Bruce Seals 28
|
| 
| Seattle Center Coliseum12,156
| 0–2
|-bgcolor=#fcc
| 3
| October 23
| San Antonio
| L 94–112
| Bruce Seals 19
|
| 
| Seattle Center Coliseum10,422
| 0–3
|-bgcolor=#fcc
| 4
| October 25
| @ Phoenix
| L 86–93
| Bruce Seals 20
|
| 
| Arizona Veterans Memorial Coliseum10,917
| 0–4
|-bgcolor=#cfc
| 5
| October 26
| Buffalo
| W 97–92
| Fred Brown 37
|
| 
| Seattle Center Coliseum8,689
| 1–4
|-bgcolor=#fcc
| 6
| October 29
| @ Chicago
| L 97–101
| Slick Watts 16
|
| 
| Chicago Stadium12,871
| 1–5
|-bgcolor=#fcc
| 7
| October 30
| @ Milwaukee
| L 95–108
| Gus Williams 21
|
| 
| MECCA Arena10,107
| 1–6

|-bgcolor=#fcc
| 8
| November 1
| @ Atlanta
| L 99–102
| Mike Green 17
|
| 
| Omni Coliseum7,782
| 1–7
|-bgcolor=#cfc
| 9
| November 2
| @ Indiana
| W 106–104 (OT)
| Gus Williams 27
|
| 
| Market Square Arena11,753
| 2–7
|-bgcolor=#fcc
| 10
| November 4
| New York
| L 92–95
| Fred Brown 31
|
| 
| Seattle Center Coliseum13,895
| 2–8
|-bgcolor=#fcc
| 11
| November 5
| @ Portland
| L 94–116
| Marvin Webster 23
|
| 
| Memorial Coliseum12,666
| 2–9
|-bgcolor=#fcc
| 12
| November 6
| Kansas City
| L 83–99
| Fred Brown 14
|
| 
| Seattle Center Coliseum11,276
| 2–10
|-bgcolor=#cfc
| 13
| November 11
| Indiana
| W 117–111
| Fred Brown,Gus Williams 20
|
| 
| Seattle Center Coliseum9,349
| 3 10
|-bgcolor=#cfc
| 14
| November 13
| New Orleans
| W 117–83
| Three players 20
|
| 
| Seattle Center Coliseum9,637
| 4–10
|-bgcolor=#fcc
| 15
| November 15
| @ Washington
| L 109–111
| Gus Williams 23
|
| 
| Capital Centre5,593
| 4–11
|-bgcolor=#fcc
| 16
| November 16
| @ Philadelphia
| L 96–101
| Marvin Webster,Slick Watts 17
|
| 
| The Spectrum13,314
| 4–12
|-bgcolor=#fcc
| 17
| November 17
| @ New Orleans
| L 116–127
| Slick Watts 18
|
| 
| Louisiana Superdome8,112
| 4–13
|-bgcolor=#fcc
| 18
| November 20
| Cleveland
| L 108–115
| Fred Brown 31
|
| 
| Seattle Center Coliseum10,005
| 4–14
|-bgcolor=#cfc
| 19
| November 23
| L. A. Lakers
| W 113–89
| Fred Brown 21
|
| 
| Seattle Center Coliseum9,373
| 5–14
|-bgcolor=#fcc
| 20
| November 25
| Chicago
| L 89–106
| Gus Williams 20
|
| 
| Seattle Center Coliseum9,384
| 5–15
|-bgcolor=#fcc
| 21
| November 27
| New Jersey
| L 96–99
| Gus Williams 36
|
| 
| Seattle Center Coliseum9,475
| 5–16
|-bgcolor=#fcc
| 22
| November 29
| @ Denver
| L 99–115
| Wally Walker 18
|
| 
| McNichols Sports Arena13,122
| 5–17
|-bgcolor=#cfc
| 23
| November 30
| @ Kansas City
| W 86–84
| Gus Williams 24
|
| 
| Kemper Arena7,692
| 6–17

|-bgcolor=#cfc
| 24
| December 2
| @ Boston
| W 111–89
| Dennis Johnson 24
|
| 
| Boston Garden11,101
| 7–17
|-bgcolor=#cfc
| 25
| December 3
| @ Buffalo
| W 102–95
| Gus Williams 29
|
| 
| Buffalo Memorial Auditorium6,841
| 8–17
|-bgcolor=#cfc
| 26
| December 5
| Atlanta
| W 99–88
| Gus Williams 26
|
| 
| Seattle Center Coliseum10,285
| 9–17
|-bgcolor=#cfc
| 27
| December 9
| Milwaukee
| W 136–123
| Gus Williams 33
|
| 
| Seattle Center Coliseum12,946
| 10–17
|-bgcolor=#cfc
| 28
| December 11
| Houston
| W 116–84
| Marvin Webster 17
|
| 
| Seattle Center Coliseum12,154
| 11–17
|-bgcolor=#fcc
| 29
| December 13
| @ Cleveland
| L 104–116
| Fred Brown 23
|
| 
| Coliseum at Richfield6,666
| 11–18
|-bgcolor=#cfc
| 30
| December 14
| @ Detroit
| W 102–92
| Gus Williams 37
|
| 
| Cobo Arena4,503
| 12–18
|-bgcolor=#cfc
| 31
| December 16
| @ L. A. Lakers
| W 98–90
| Fred Brown 24
|
| 
| The Forum10,029
| 13–18
|-bgcolor=#cfc
| 32
| December 18
| Washington
| W 111–109 (OT)
| Marvin Webster 21
|
| 
| Seattle Center Coliseum13,563
| 14–18
|-bgcolor=#cfc
| 33
| December 20
| Denver
| W 93–88
| Dennis Johnson, Fred Brown 18
|
| 
| Seattle Center Coliseum11,825
| 15–18
|-bgcolor=#cfc
| 34
| December 22
| Boston
| W 132–99
| Bruce Seals,Jack Sikma 21
|
| 
| Seattle Center Coliseum11,970
| 16–18
|-bgcolor=#fcc
| 35
| December 25
| L. A. Lakers
| L 96–111
| John Johnson 22
|
| 
| Seattle Center Coliseum14,096
| 16–19
|-bgcolor=#fcc
| 36
| December 27
| @ Phoenix
| L 105–131
| Fred Brown 28
|
| 
| Arizona Veterans Memorial Coliseum12,543
| 16–20
|-bgcolor=#cfc
| 37
| December 30
| Phoenix
| W 121–110
| Dennis Johnson
|
| 
| Seattle Center Coliseum14,098
| 17–20

|-bgcolor=#cfc
| 38
| January 1
| Chicago
| W 114–96
| Gus Williams 32
|
| 
| Seattle Center Coliseum11,419
| 18–20
|-bgcolor=#cfc
| 39
| January 4
| Kansas City
| W 116–110
| Fred Brown 20
|
| 
| Seattle Center Coliseum9,979
| 19–20
|-bgcolor=#cfc
| 40
| January 8
| Golden State
| W 99–91
| Marvin Webster 17
|
| 
| Seattle Center Coliseum14,098
| 20–20
|-bgcolor=#cfc
| 41
| January 11
| Detroit
| W 106–100
| Marvin Webster 21
|
| 
| Seattle Center Coliseum10,127
| 21–20
|-bgcolor=#cfc
| 42
| January 13
| Cleveland
| W 104–98
| Fred Brown 23
|
| 
| Seattle Center Coliseum12,683
| 22–20
|-bgcolor=#cfc
| 43
| January 15
| New York
| W 108–102
| Gus Williams 30
|
| 
| Seattle Center Coliseum12,538
| 23–20
|-bgcolor=#fcc
| 44
| January 17
| @ San Antonio
| L 113–119
| Jack Sikma 26
|
| 
| HemisFair Arena8,677
| 23–21
|-bgcolor=#cfc
| 45
| January 18
| @ Houston
| W 106–104
| Fred Brown 23
|
| 
| The Summit7,046
| 24–21
|-bgcolor=#cfc
| 46
| January 22
| @ Boston
| W 103–92
| Gus Williams 29
|
| 
| Boston Garden12,058
| 25–21
|-bgcolor=#fcc
| 47
| January 25
| Philadelphia
| L 125–128
| John Johnson 23
|
| 
| Seattle Center Coliseum14,098
| 25–22
|-bgcolor=#cfc
| 48
| January 27
| New Jersey
| W 95–90
| Fred Brown 25
|
| 
| Seattle Center Coliseum13,013
| 26–22
|-bgcolor=#cfc
| 49
| January 29
| Milwaukee
| W 103–101
| Gus Williams 22
|
| 
| Seattle Center Coliseum14,098
| 27–22

|-bgcolor=#fcc
| 50
| February 8
| Washington
| L 100–106
| Gus Williams 21
|
| 
| Seattle Center Coliseum12,126
| 27–23
|-bgcolor=#cfc
| 51
| February 10
| Denver
| W 126–123 (OT)
| Marvin Webster 26
|
| 
| Seattle Center Coliseum13,795
| 28–23
|-bgcolor=#fcc
| 52
| February 12
| @ Philadelphia
| L 99–109
| Gus Williams 28
|
| 
| The Spectrum16,101
| 28–24
|-bgcolor=#fcc
| 53
| February 14
| @ Buffalo
| L 100–101
| Fred Brown 20
|
| 
| Buffalo Memorial Auditorium4,127
| 28–25
|-bgcolor=#fcc
| 54
| February 16
| @ New Jersey
| L 92–101
| Gus Williams 24
|
| 
| Rutgers Athletic Center3,117
| 28–26
|-bgcolor=#cfc
| 55
| February 17
| @ Chicago
| W 106–98
| Gus Williams 23
|
| 
| Chicago Stadium17,211
| 29–26
|-bgcolor=#cfc
| 56
| February 19
| @ Milwaukee
| W 108–103
| Gus Williams 23
|
| 
| MECCA Arena10,938
| 30–26
|-bgcolor=#fcc
| 57
| February 21
| @ New York
| L 120–122
| Gus Williams 24
|
| 
| Madison Square Garden12,287
| 30–27
|-bgcolor=#cfc
| 58
| February 22
| @ New Jersey
| W 94–83
| Gus Williams 31
|
| 
| Rutgers Athletic Center2,789
| 31–27
|-bgcolor=#cfc
| 59
| February 25
| Detroit
| W 118–104
| Gus Williams 22
|
| 
| Seattle Center Coliseum14,098
| 32–27
|-bgcolor=#cfc
| 60
| February 26
| Philadelphia
| W 99–97
| Fred Brown 32
|
| 
| Seattle Center Coliseum14,098
| 33–27
|-bgcolor=#cfc
| 61
| February 28
| @ Kansas City
| W 114–107 (OT)
| Gus Williams 27
|
| 
| Kemper Arena5,371
| 34–27

|-bgcolor=#fcc
| 62
| March 3
| @ Indiana
| L 111–115
| Gus Williams 20
|
| 
| Market Square Arena10,087
| 34–28
|-bgcolor=#fcc
| 63
| March 4
| @ New Orleans
| L 104–113
| Dennis Johnson 23
|
| 
| Louisiana Superdome16,232
| 34–29
|-bgcolor=#fcc
| 64
| March 5
| @ Atlanta
| L 94–101
| Fred Brown,Jack Sikma 20
|
| 
| Omni Coliseum3,018
| 34–30
|-bgcolor=#cfc
| 65
| March 8
| @ San Antonio
| W 95–94
| Dennis Johnson 27
|
| 
| HemisFair Arena9,113
| 35–30
|-bgcolor=#cfc
| 66
| March 11
| @ Houston
| W 93–91
| Fred Brown 25
|
| 
| The Summit7,144
| 36–30
|-bgcolor=#fcc
| 67
| March 14
| @ Washington
| L 115–120
| Dennis Johnson 26
|
| 
| Capital Centre7,804
| 36–31
|-bgcolor=#cfc
| 68
| March 16
| New Orleans
| W 123–98
| Gus Williams 19
|
| 
| Seattle Center Coliseum14,098
| 37–31
|-bgcolor=#cfc
| 69
| March 17
| @ L. A. Lakers
| W 105–98
| Dennis Johnson 23
|
| 
| The Forum12,997
| 38–31
|-bgcolor=#cfc
| 70
| March 19
| San Antonio
| W 116–98
| Fred Brown 20
|
| 
| Seattle Center Coliseum14,098
| 39–31
|-bgcolor=#fcc
| 71
| March 21
| @ Portland
| L 96–102
| John Johnson 26
|
| 
| Memorial Coliseum12,666
| 39–32
|-bgcolor=#cfc
| 72
| March 22
| Buffalo
| W 97–92
| Gus Williams 25
|
| 
| Seattle Center Coliseum13,179
| 40–32
|-bgcolor=#cfc
| 73
| March 24
| Indiana
| W 104–102
| Jack Sikma 28
|
| 
| Seattle Center Coliseum14,098
| 41–32
|-bgcolor=#cfc
| 74
| March 26
| Boston
| W 112–101
| Gus Williams 34
|
| 
| Seattle Center Coliseum14,098
| 42–32
|-bgcolor=#fcc
| 75
| March 28
| @ Cleveland
| L 100–112
| Dennis Johnson 21
|
| 
| Coliseum at Richfield9,765
| 42–33
|-bgcolor=#fcc
| 76
| March 29
| @ Detroit
| L 116–121
| Gus Williams 32
|
| 
| Cobo Arena4,620
| 42–34
|-bgcolor=#cfc
| 77
| March 31
| @ Denver
| W 111–109
| John Johnson 25
|
| 
| McNichols Sports Arena17,270
| 43–34

|-bgcolor=#cfc
| 78
| April 2
| Portland
| W 101–86
| Gus Williams 29
|
| 
| Seattle Center Coliseum14,098
| 44–34
|-bgcolor=#cfc
| 79
| April 5
| Houston
| W 113–100
| Gus Williams 22
|
| 
| Seattle Center Coliseum12,846
| 45–34
|-bgcolor=#cfc
| 80
| April 7
| Phoenix
| W 95–83
| Fred Brown 16
|
| 
| Seattle Center Coliseum14,098
| 46–34
|-bgcolor=#fcc
| 81
| April 8
| @ Golden State
| L 87–102
| Gus Williams 20
|
| 
| Oakland–Alameda County Coliseum Arena13,327
| 46–35
|-bgcolor=#cfc
| 82
| April 9
| Golden State
| W 111–105
| Fred Brown 24
|
| 
| Seattle Center Coliseum13,285
| 47–35

Playoffs

|- align="center" bgcolor="#ccffcc"
| 1
| April 12
| Los Angeles
| W 102–90
| Gus Williams (23)
| Marvin Webster (14)
| Fred Brown (5)
| Seattle Center Coliseum14,098
| 1–0
|- align="center" bgcolor="#ffcccc"
| 2
| April 14
| @ Los Angeles
| L 99–105
| Dennis Johnson (21)
| Marvin Webster (10)
| Sikma, Williams (4)
| The Forum15,051
| 1–1
|- align="center" bgcolor="#ccffcc"
| 3
| April 16
| Los Angeles
| W 111–102
| Jack Sikma (24)
| Marvin Webster (18)
| Gus Williams (8)
| Seattle Center Coliseum14,098
| 2–1
|-

|- align="center" bgcolor="#ccffcc"
| 1
| April 18
| @ Portland
| W 104–95
| Marvin Webster (24)
| Jack Sikma (11)
| Dennis Johnson (4)
| Memorial Coliseum12,666
| 1–0
|- align="center" bgcolor="#ffcccc"
| 2
| April 21
| @ Portland
| L 93–96
| Gus Williams (31)
| Marvin Webster (15)
| Marvin Webster (7)
| Memorial Coliseum12,666
| 1–1
|- align="center" bgcolor="#ccffcc"
| 3
| April 23
| Portland
| W 99–84
| J. Johnson, Brown (18)
| Marvin Webster (23)
| Fred Brown (4)
| Seattle Center Coliseum14,098
| 2–1
|- align="center" bgcolor="#ccffcc"
| 4
| April 26
| Portland
| W 100–98
| Jack Sikma (28)
| Jack Sikma (10)
| Dennis Johnson (8)
| Seattle Center Coliseum14,098
| 3–1
|- align="center" bgcolor="#ffcccc"
| 5
| April 30
| @ Portland
| L 89–113
| Marvin Webster (16)
| Paul Silas (10)
| Gus Williams (4)
| Memorial Coliseum12,666
| 3–2
|- align="center" bgcolor="#ccffcc"
| 6
| May 1
| Portland
| W 105–94
| Dennis Johnson (20)
| Marvin Webster (11)
| Gus Williams (7)
| Seattle Center Coliseum14,098
| 4–2
|-

|- align="center" bgcolor="#ffcccc"
| 1
| May 5
| @ Denver
| L 107–116
| Marvin Webster (28)
| Marvin Webster (16)
| Gus Williams (8)
| McNichols Sports Arena17,387
| 0–1
|- align="center" bgcolor="#ccffcc"
| 2
| May 7
| @ Denver
| W 121–111
| Fred Brown (26)
| Paul Silas (12)
| Fred Brown (6)
| McNichols Sports Arena17,838
| 1–1
|- align="center" bgcolor="#ccffcc"
| 3
| May 10
| Denver
| W 105–91
| John Johnson (20)
| Marvin Webster (16)
| D. Johnson, Webster (3)
| Seattle Center Coliseum14,098
| 2–1
|- align="center" bgcolor="#ccffcc"
| 4
| May 12
| Denver
| W 100–94
| Dennis Johnson (31)
| Paul Silas (14)
| John Johnson (7)
| Seattle Center Coliseum14,098
| 3–1
|- align="center" bgcolor="#ffcccc"
| 5
| May 14
| @ Denver
| L 114–123
| Gus Williams (31)
| Marvin Webster (12)
| Williams, J. Johnson (6)
| McNichols Sports Arena17,006
| 3–2
|- align="center" bgcolor="#ccffcc"
| 6
| May 17
| Denver
| W 123–108
| Fred Brown (26)
| Paul Silas (13)
| Dennis Johnson (7)
| Seattle Center Coliseum14,098
| 4–2
|-

|- align="center" bgcolor="#ccffcc"
| 1
| May 21
| Washington
| W 106–102
| Fred Brown (30)
| Marvin Webster (14)
| Dennis Johnson (5)
| Seattle Center Coliseum14,098
| 1–0
|- align="center" bgcolor="#ffcccc"
| 2
| May 25
| @ Washington
| L 98–106
| Gus Williams (24)
| Marvin Webster (12)
| three players tied (4)
| Capital Centre19,035
| 1–1
|- align="center" bgcolor="#ccffcc"
| 3
| May 28
| @ Washington
| W 93–92
| Webster, Williams (20)
| Paul Silas (14)
| five players tied (2)
| Capital Centre19,035
| 2–1
|- align="center" bgcolor="#ffcccc"
| 4
| May 30
| Washington
| L 116–120 (OT)
| Dennis Johnson (33)
| Marvin Webster (15)
| Paul Silas (6)
| Kingdome39,457
| 2–2
|- align="center" bgcolor="#ccffcc"
| 5
| June 2
| Washington
| W 98–94
| Fred Brown (26)
| Marvin Webster (13)
| John Johnson (7)
| Seattle Center Coliseum14,098
| 3–2
|- align="center" bgcolor="#ffcccc"
| 6
| June 4
| @ Washington
| L 82–117
| Fred Brown (17)
| Marvin Webster (12)
| Gus Williams (6)
| Capital Centre19,035
| 3–3
|- align="center" bgcolor="#ffcccc"
| 7
| June 7
| Washington
| L 99–105
| Marvin Webster (27)
| Marvin Webster (19)
| Gus Williams (5)
| Seattle Center Coliseum14,098
| 3–4
|-

Awards and honors
 NBA All-Rookie First Team: Jack Sikma

Player statistics

Regular season

Playoffs

References

 SuperSonics on Basketball Reference

Seattle SuperSonics seasons
Seattle
Western Conference (NBA) championship seasons